Hebardville is an unincorporated community in Athens County, in the U.S. state of Ohio.

History
A variant name is Hebbardsville. A post office called Hebbardsville was established in 1832, and remained in operation until 1918. In 1883, Hebbardsville had about 100 residents.

References

Unincorporated communities in Athens County, Ohio
1832 establishments in Ohio
Populated places established in 1832
Unincorporated communities in Ohio